Alpini Island is an island in the Svalbard archipelago, north of Orvin Land in Nordaustlandet. It is located off the headland Bergströmodden, at the mouth of Finn Malmgren Fjord. The island is named after the Italian military corps Alpini, due to a visit to the island in 1928 by an expedition leader and captain of an Alpini regiment, Gennaro Sora.

References

Islands of Svalbard